Lovage was a collaborative project headed by Dan the Automator, under his pseudonym "Nathaniel Merriweather" (a persona he created for the project Handsome Boy Modeling School). Their only album is titled Music to Make Love to Your Old Lady By, which was created in team with Mike Patton and Jennifer Charles, who both provide vocals.  Kid Koala plays turntables and samples and toured with the band for their 13-city U.S. tour.

Discography
Music to Make Love to Your Old Lady By (Tommy Boy 2001)

Music videos
"Book of the Month"
"Stroker Ace"

References

External links
 
 Nathaniel Merriweather - Lovage - Music To Make Love To Your Old Lady By
Jennifer Charles interviewed on Jekyll and Hyde, 106FM Jerusalem 2010

Trip hop groups
American electronic music groups
Downtempo musicians